Presteid is a village in the municipality of Hamarøy in Nordland county, Norway.  It is located immediately east of the village of Oppeid, along the Presteidfjorden.  Presteid is part of the Oppeid urban area which has a population (2018) of 551.

The village is the location of Hamarøy Church, the main church for the municipality.  The famous Norwegian author Knut Hamsun lived in this village from the age of 9 until 14.  He often wrote about Presteid in his works.  The Knut Hamsun Centre is located in Presteid, and it is a museum about the author and his works. Stoklands Bilruter, a bus company, was based here until it was merged with Saltens Bilruter.

References

Hamarøy
Villages in Nordland
Populated places of Arctic Norway